The Albany County militia was the colonial militia of Albany County, New York. Drawn from the general male population, by law all male inhabitants from 15 to 55 had to be enrolled in militia companies, the later known by the name of their commanders. By the 1700s, the militia of the Province of New York was organized by county and officers were appointed by the royal government. By the early phases of the American Revolutionary War the county`s militia had grown into seventeen regiments.

Militia units
1st Albany County Militia Regiment - Col. Abraham Cuyler, Col. Jacob Lansing, Jr.
2nd Albany County Militia Regiment - Col. Abraham Wemple
3rd Albany County Militia Regiment - Col. Philip P. Schuyler
4th Albany County Militia Regiment - Col. Kiliaen van Rensselaer
5th Albany County Militia Regiment - Col. Gerritt G. Van Den Bergh, Col. Henry Quackenbos
6th Albany County Militia Regiment - Col. Stephen John Schuyler
7th Albany County Militia Regiment - Col. Abraham J. van Alstyne
8th Albany County militia Regiment - Col. Robert Van Rensselaer
9th Albany County Militia Regiment - Col. Peter van Ness
10th Albany County Militia Regiment - Col. Morris Graham, Col. Henry Livingston
11th Albany County Militia Regiment - Col. Anthony van Bergen
12th Albany County Militia Regiment - Col. Jacobus Van Schoonhoven
13th Albany County Militia Regiment - Col. John McCrea, Col. Cornelius van Veghten
14th Albany County Militia Regiment - Col. John Knickerbacker, Col. Peter W. Yates
15th Albany County Militia Regiment - Col. Peter Vroman
16th Albany County Militia Regiment - Col. John Blair, Col. Lewis van Woert
17th Albany County Militia Regiment - Col. William B. Whiting
Independent Company, Albany County Militia - Cpt. Petrus van Gaasbeck

Militia generals
Maj.Gen. Peter Gansevoort
Brig. Gen. Abraham Ten Broeck
Brig. Gen. Robert Van Rensselaer

See also
Tryon County militia
List of United States militia units in the American Revolutionary War

Footnotes

References

Albany militia